Frassineto Po is a comune (municipality) in the Province of Alessandria in the Italian region Piedmont, located about  east of Turin and about  north of Alessandria.

Frassineto Po borders the following municipalities: Borgo San Martino, Breme, Candia Lomellina, Casale Monferrato, Ticineto, and Valmacca.

Demographic evolution

References

External links
 www.comune.frassinetopo.al.it

Cities and towns in Piedmont